Saman Halgamuge was educated in Germany and Sri Lanka and he is currently a Professor of University of Melbourne, Australia. He is an elected Fellow of Institute of Electrical and Electronics Engineers, USA. He is a highly cited expert in his field and listed as one of the top 2% cited experts for AI and Image Processing in the Stanford University Database published in 2020. His most-cited paper being Self-organizing hierarchical particle swarm optimizer with time-varying acceleration coefficients, with over 3300 citations, according to GoogleScholar. He is a Distinguished Speaker/Lecturer on Computational Intelligence appointed by IEEE. He has supervised 45 PhD scholars to completion and  delivered over 50 keynotes at International and national conferences.

Education
Prof Saman Halgamuge, FIEEE received his primary and secondary education at Ananda College and gained admission to University of Moratuwa where he graduated with a degree in electronics and telecommunications. Later he attended Technische Universität Darmstadt in Germany to study Masters and PhD in electrical engineering. In 1995 he earned his doctorate in electrical engineering.

Career 
He started his research career as a research associate of Technische Universität Darmstadt, Germany and then he was a lecturer in University of South Australia and moved to University of Melbourne where he is a professor in mechanical engineering. He was the founding Director of the PhD training centre Melbourne India Postgraduate Program (MIPP)   of University of Melbourne and Associate Dean in International Engagement of Faculty of Engineering and IT, University of Melbourne.
He has spent several years as the professor and head (director) of School of Engineering at Australian National University.

Current and previous honorary appointments:

Distinguished Visiting Professor of Hebei University of Technology, Tianjin, China

Endowed Visiting Chair Professor of Computing (named after Prof V. K. Samaranayake), University of Colombo, Sri Lanka

Honorary Professor of:
 
Australian National University

Bandung Institute of Technology (ITB), Indonesia

University of Peradeniya, Sri Lanka

SLIIT, Sri Lanka

Tongji University, China

Nanjing University of Aeronautics and Astronautics, China

National Institute of Fundamental Studies (NIFS), Sri Lanka

Visiting Professor of:

Nanyang Technological University, Singapore

University of Malaya, Malaysia

Member of

Australian Research Council College of Experts, Australia

Research Advisory Committee of Universiti Teknologi Petronas, Malaysia

Visiting Review Committee of Chinese University of Hong Kong

Expert Advisory Panel, Foundation of Australia Japan Studies

References

Living people
Sinhalese academics
Year of birth missing (living people)